Ò, ò (o-grave) is a letter of the Latin script.

It is used in Catalan, Emilian-Romagnol, Lombard, Occitan, Kashubian, Sardinian, Scottish Gaelic, Taos, Vietnamese, Haitian Creole, Norwegian, Welsh and Italian.

Usage in various languages

Kashubian
Ò is the 28th letter of the Kashubian alphabet and represents .

Vietnamese
In the Vietnamese alphabet, ò is the huyền tone (falling tone) of "o".

Chinese
In Chinese pinyin, ò is the yángqù tone (阳去, falling tone) of "o".

Italian
In Italian, the grave accent is used over any vowel to indicate word-final stress: Niccolò (equivalent of Nicholas and the forename of Machiavelli).

It can also be used on the nonfinal vowels o and e to indicate that the vowel is stressed and that it is open: còrso, "Corsican", vs. córso, "course"/"run", the past participle of "correre". Ò represents the open-mid back rounded vowel /ɔ/ and È represents the open-mid front unrounded vowel /ɛ/.

Emilian-Romagnol 
In Emilian, ò is used to represent [ɔː], e.g. òs [ɔːs] "bone". In Romagnol, it is used to represent [ɔ], e.g. piò [pjɔ] "more".

Norwegian
Ò can be found in the Norwegian word òg which is  an alternative spelling of også, meaning "also". This word is found in both Nynorsk and Bokmål.

Macedonian
In Macedonian, ò is used to differentiate the word òд (eng. walk) from the more common од (eng. from). Both ò and о are pronounced as [o].

Welsh

In Welsh, ò is sometimes used, usually in words borrowed from another language, to mark vowels that are short when a long vowel would normally be expected, e.g., clòs (eng. close (of the weather)).

Character mappings

O-grave
Vowel letters